Samsung Galaxy On8 is an Android smartphone developed by Samsung Electronics. It was initially released in October 2016. The phone has 16GB of internal storage and 3GB of RAM. It also has an Octa-core 1.6 GHz Cortex-A53 CPU and a Mali-T720MP2 GPU.

Specifications

Software 
Originally, Galaxy On8 was shipped with Android 6.0.1 Marshmallow.

Hardware 
The Samsung Galaxy On8 has 16GB of internal storage and 3GB of RAM. A microSD card can be inserted into the phone for up to 256GB of additional storage. The phone has an Octa-core 1.6 GHz Cortex-A53 CPU and a Mali-T720MP2 GPU. It has a 13 MP rear camera and a 5 MP front camera

History 
The Samsung Galaxy On8 was first announced in September 2016. It was released a month later in October.

See also 
Samsung
Samsung Electronics
Samsung Galaxy
Android

References 

Samsung Galaxy
Mobile phones introduced in 2016
Android (operating system) devices
Samsung mobile phones